Hochsprung is German and literally means "high jump". It may refer to:

 High jump, a field event in athletics
 Internationales Hochsprung-Meeting Eberstadt, an international high jump competition in Eberstadt, Germany
 Hochsprung mit Musik, an international high jump competition in Arnstadt, Germany
 Dawn Hochsprung, the principal of the school involved in the Sandy Hook Elementary School shooting